Tongjiang may refer to the following locations in China:

Tongjiang, Heilongjiang, county-level city of Jiamusi, Heilongjiang
Tongjiang, Tongjiang, Heilongjiang, town in and seat of Tongjiang, Heilongjiang
Tongjiang County, Sichuan

Subdistricts
Tongjiang Subdistrict, Harbin, in Daoli District
Tongjiang Subdistrict, Nehe, Heilongjiang
Tongjiang Subdistrict, Wuxi, in Chong'an District, Wuxi, Jiangsu
Tongjiang Subdistrict, Jilin City, in Changyi District, Jilin City, Jilin

Other divisions
Tongjiang, Wangkui County, Heilongjiang
Tongjiang Township, Fuyuan County, Heilongjiang